The 14th New Zealand Parliament was a term of the New Zealand Parliament. It was elected at the 1899 general election in December of that year.

1899 general election

The 1899 general election was held on Wednesday, 6 December in the general electorates and on Tuesday, 19 December in the Māori electorates, respectively. A total of 74 MPs were elected; 34 represented North Island electorates, 36 represented South Island electorates, and the remaining four represented Māori electorates.  373,744 voters were enrolled and the official turnout at the election was 77.6%.

Sessions
The 14th Parliament sat for three sessions, and was prorogued on 5 November 1902.

Overview of seats

Ministries
The Liberal Government of New Zealand had taken office on 24 January 1891.  The Seddon Ministry under Richard Seddon had taken office in 1893 during the term of the 11th Parliament.  The Seddon Ministry remained in power for the whole term of this Parliament and held power until Seddon's death on 10 June 1906.

Initial composition of the 14th Parliament

By-elections during 14th Parliament
There were a number of changes during the term of the 14th Parliament.

Notes

References

14